The following lists events that happened in 1939 in El Salvador.

Incumbents
President: Maximiliano Hernández Martínez 
Vice President: Vacant

Events

January
 3 January – Voters in El Salvador voted Maximiliano Hernández Martínez as President of El Salvador for a second term with 210,810 votes in a 100% margin. He was the only candidate. The 1939 Salvadoran Constitutional Assembly election also occurred and the National Pro Patria Party won all 42 seats.

September
 18 September – C.D. Dragón, a Salvadoran football club, was established.

References

 
El Salvador
1930s in El Salvador
Years of the 20th century in El Salvador
El Salvador